Sandro Tonali (born 8 May 2000) is an Italian professional footballer who plays as a midfielder for  club AC Milan and the Italy national team.

Club career

Brescia

2017–2019: Serie B
Tonali made his professional debut for Brescia Calcio on 26 August 2017, aged 17, coming on as a substitute in the Serie B away match lost 2–1 against Avellino. On 28 April 2018 he scored his first professional career goal, in a 4–2 defeat against Salernitana in Serie B. He obtained 19 league appearances in total during his first season as a professional player, scoring two goals and providing two assists during the 2017–18 Serie B season.

The following season, Tonali won the Serie B title with Brescia, and achieved promotion to Serie A, featuring as a starter for the club throughout the entire 2018–19 season.

2019–2020: Serie A
He made his Serie A debut on 25 August 2019, aged 19, in a 1–0 away win against Cagliari. On 29 September, he assisted Mario Balotelli's goal from a corner kick in a 2–1 away loss to Napoli; he also scored a goal during the match with a powerful shot from outside the area, which was disallowed by VAR, however, for a foul by Brescia's Dimitri Bisoli on Napoli's Nikola Maksimović. He scored his first Serie A goal on 26 October, netting a long-range free kick into the top corner from the left flank, which was the opening goal in an eventual 3–1 away defeat to Genoa.

2020–2021: Loan to AC Milan
On 9 September 2020, Tonali joined AC Milan, on a season-long loan for €10 million with an option to buy for €15 million, plus bonuses worth €10 million. The player will earn a yearly wage of €2 million for five years. Three days later, he made his non-competitive debut in a friendly at Milanello against his former club Brescia.

Tonali made his competitive debut for Milan on 17 September 2020, coming on as a substitute in the 83rd minute in a 2–0 victory against Shamrock Rovers FC in the second round of Europa League qualifying. He made his Serie A debut for Milan on 21 September 2020, coming off the bench in the 77th minute in a 2–0 victory over Bologna F.C. 1909 at the San Siro. Tonali finished the season with 37 appearances, 23 of those in the starting eleven.

AC Milan

2021–2022: Serie A champion 
On 8 July 2021, Milan officially purchased Tonali's rights from Brescia and he signed a five-year contract with the club. He took a pay-cut to secure his childhood dream move to Milan and was praised by the fans on social media for this gesture.

Tonali scored his first goal with Milan's shirt on 29 August 2021 against Cagliari, a free kick that opened the scoresheet in eventual 4–1 win. On 3 October at Gewiss Stadium against Atalanta, Tonali dispossessed the ball from Freuler and ran to the opponents box to score the second goal in eventual 3–2 victory for Milan. On 25 February 2022, Tonali assisted Leao's goal against Udinese, becoming the youngest midfielder to have scored more than one goal (two) and delivered more than one assist (two) in Serie A that season.

On 24 April as the match against Lazio was heading to 1–1 draw, Tonali scored the winner in the stoppage time, securing the lead for his team in Serie A table.

On 8 May 2022, his 22nd birthday, Tonali scored an equalizing and a winning goal in the 3–1 away Serie A victory against Hellas Verona, with both goals assisted by Rafael Leão in a similar manner. Before that, he also scored an opening goal which was eventually disallowed due to small offside. The comeback victory brought Milan back on top of the Serie A following Inter's 48-hour stay there in a close championship race. Tonali is also the youngest midfielder to have scored five or more goals in Serie A this season (and the second-youngest among all players, older only than Bologna's Aaron Hickey).

After 3-0 away win against Sassuolo on 22 May, Milan secured their first Scudetto in 11 years, In total, Tonali played 36 games in this campaign, scoring 5 goals and providing 3 assists.

Tonali's performance this season brought the attention and praise of renowned Italian football pundits, the likes of Di Canio, Donadoni and Capello, the latter went on to state that Tonali would've found a place in even the greatest of Milan's generation in the past.

International career

Youth 
With the Italy U19 he took part in the 2018 European Under-19 Championship, reaching the final of the tournament, where Italy lost 4–3 after extra time against Portugal.

He made his debut with the Italy U21 team on 21 March 2019, in a 0–0 friendly draw against Austria in Trieste. He took part in the 2019 European Under-21 Championship.

Senior 
In November 2018, he was called for the first time to the senior national team by manager Roberto Mancini. After appearing for the Italy U21 side in a 0–0 away draw against Ireland on 10 October 2019, in a European qualifier, he was called up to the Italy senior squad once again the following day, for the team's Euro 2020 qualifiers against Greece and Liechtenstein.

Tonali made his senior international debut on 15 October 2019, coming on as a substitute in the 5–0 away win against Liechtenstein in Vaduz. His first start for Italy came in his following appearance on 15 November, a 3–0 away win over Bosnia and Herzegovina.

Style of play
Regarded as a promising young Italian player in his position by the media, Tonali is a regista. He is often likened to Andrea Pirlo – who also started his career with Brescia – in terms of his movement, coordination, appearance, technical qualities, position, and playing style. A strong, fast, energetic, elegant, and creative midfielder, with excellent vision and an ability to read the game, Tonali usually plays in a central or defensive midfield role as deep-lying playmaker in a 4–3–3 formation, Dictating play for Brescia with his passing in midfield, he set up two goals and scored two himself in his 19 appearances in Serie B during the 2017–18 season. Although naturally right-footed, he is known for his accurate long passing ability with either foot. Moreover, he is also adept at taking set-pieces.

In addition to Pirlo, Tonali has also cited Steven Gerrard and Luka Modrić as influences, and has also compared his own playing style to that of Gennaro Gattuso. In July 2019, he was named by UEFA as one of the 50 promising young players to watch for the 2019–20 season.

Personal life
Tonali has been a Milan fan since childhood.

Career statistics

Club

International

Honours
Brescia
Serie B: 2018–19

AC Milan
Serie A: 2021–22

Italy U19
UEFA European Under-19 Championship runner-up: 2018

Individual
UEFA European Under-19 Championship Team of the Tournament: 2018
Serie B Footballer of the Year: 2018
Serie B Best Young Player: 2019
Italian Golden Boy Award: 2020
IFFHS Men's World Youth (U20) Team: 2020
Serie A Player of the Month: May 2022
Premio Bulgarelli Number 8: 2022

References

External links

 Profile at the AC Milan website
 
 
 Profile at FIGC.it 

2000 births
Living people
People from Lodi, Lombardy
Footballers from Lombardy
Italian footballers
Association football midfielders
Brescia Calcio players
A.C. Milan players
Serie A players
Serie B players
Italy under-21 international footballers
Italy youth international footballers
Italy international footballers
Sportspeople from the Province of Lodi